Stenanthemum reissekii is a species of flowering plant in the family Rhamnaceae and is endemic to the south-west of Western Australia. It is an erect or low-lying shrub with hairy young stems, egg-shaped or narrowly egg-shaped leaves with the narrower end towards the base, and clusters of densely hairy white or cream-coloured flowers.

Description
The edges of the leaves curve downwards, the upper surface covered with minute pimples or glabrous, the lower surface densely covered with long, rust-coloured hairs.

Taxonomy and naming
Stenanthemum reissekii was first formally described in 1995 by Barbara Lynette Rye in the journal Nuytsia from specimens collected by Alex George, north of Badgingarra in 1966. The specific epithet (reissekii) honours Siegfried Reissek.

Distribution and habitat
This species grows on laterite hills between Mount Peron in Lesueur National Park and Badgingarra, in the Geraldton Sandplains bioregion of south-western Western Australia.

Conservation status
Stenanthemum reissekii is listed as "not threatened" by the Government of Western Australia Department of Biodiversity, Conservation and Attractions.

References

reissek
Rosales of Australia
Flora of Western Australia
Plants described in 1995
Taxa named by Barbara Lynette Rye